Lobos 1707 is an independent spirits producer. Inspired by his ancestor of the same name, Founder and Chief Creative Officer Diego Osorio launched Lobos 1707 in 2020 with CEO Dia Simms and top-tier athlete LeBron James as an early backer. The portfolio includes Lobos 1707 Tequila, Extra Añejo, Reposado, Joven and Lobos 1707 Mezcal Artesanal. Lobos 1707 Tequila and Mezcal are cultivated from 100% blue weber agave and then finished in Pedro Ximénez (PX) wine barrels, using the solera method before bottling. Product design includes the Osorio Family Coat of Arms and the Agave Wind Rose Compass to represent the union of Spanish and Mexican cultures.

Lobos 1707, named after the Spanish word meaning “wolves” and dedicated to “celebrating the strength of the pack”.

History 
Actor, Founder and Chief Creative Officer, Diego Osorio, launched Lobos 1707 Tequila which aims to recreate a process inspired by the 16th century voyages of his ancestor with the same name which resulted from bringing Spanish oak barrels filled with Mexican agave liquor back to Spain.

Launched on November 18, 2020 in New York, California, Florida.

On March 19, 2021, Lobos 1707 announces their expansion into the Canadian market, starting with Ontario, exclusively sold at the LCBO, at a launch party hosted inside Harbour 60 steakhouse.

Lebron James’s Involvement 
James is known for his taste and deep passion for fine red wines. James has been credited with shaping trends in the wine industry and with the emergence of a group of wine-loving NBA players.

James had been nurturing an interest in tequila when he was introduced to Lobos 1707’s founder—actor and entrepreneur Diego Osorio—by Paul Wachter, a mutual friend who also serves as the financial advisor to James and other big-name clients, like Bono and Arnold Schwarzenegger.

James is an early backer of the brand.

Production Process / Flavors / etc 
Each marque uses traditional Mexican distillation and aging process and is finished in Pedro Ximénez (PX) wine barrels from Spain.The formula is developed by Master Distillers from Mexico and Spain.

Lobos 1707 Tequila, Joven 

 Lobos 1707 Tequila, Joven is carbon-filtered, then finished in the brand’s historic Pedro Ximénez (PX) wine barrels using the solera system method, resulting in a more mature flavor profile than other Silver or Blanco tequilas.

Lobos 1707 Tequila, Reposado 

 Lobos 1707 Tequila, Reposado rests for over six slow months in American white oak barrels. The liquid is blended with a touch of Lobos 1707 Tequila, Extra Añejo and finished in the brand’s Pedro Ximénez (PX) wine barrels using the solera system method.

Lobos 1707 Tequila, Extra Añejo 

 Lobos 1707 Tequila, Extra Anejo is aged for three years in American white oak and finished in Pedro Ximénez (PX) wine barrels using the solera system method for a lasting flavor experience.

Lobos 1707 Mezcal Artesanal 

 Lobos 1707 Mezcal is made with 100% espadín agave which has been roasted in an open Oaxacan fire pit.

In Popular Culture 
Other famous investors include Arnold Schwarzenegger, Maverick Carter, Anthony Davis, Draymond Green, Rich Paul.

Although Drake has been seen enjoying and attending Lobos 1707 launch events, there is no confirmation of any ties to the brand. The Toronto Raptor's Fred Vanvleet, and Vinay Virmani, the CCO of Uninterrupted Canada, are also both investors.

References 

2020 establishments in Mexico
Food and drink companies of Mexico
Spirit drinks
Tequila